John Peter (J.P.) Hubrick (1858 - January 22, 1930) was an Alaskan adventurer, hunter, newsman and photographer best known for his panoramic photographs of the Wrangell mountain range through the early 1900s.  A resident of McCarthy, Alaska, Hubrick started the town's first newspaper, the Copper Bee in February 1916.  The paper lasted for only four issues, however, and as such Hubrick's real legacy is derived from his photographic work.

Hubrick's photographic talent is evident in his breathtaking panoramas of the Alaskan countryside.  The panoramas can be over six feet long and some are hand-tinted in supreme detail.  Some carry scenes from the past.  In the Hubrick panorama "Goat Trail," you can see many goats walking the trail.  In the panorama "Taken From Nicolai Hill," you get a little snapshot of the Hubrick party at a photography shoot.  You can see two riding horses, pack animals, and his guide.

It is said that most of Mr. Hubrick's photographs were personally sold in or around McCarthy, Alaska circa 1916–1930.  The best count (guess) of known existing original photographic prints puts the number around 25.  There are also some negatives.  Hubrick copies are sold in Alaska for around $45. In addition to art, panoramas like those of J.P. Hubrick have other uses. They are used today to measure and compare changes in snow pack, providing valuable evidence on issues such as global warming.  And herd sizes?  How many goats, do you think, would be walking that trail today?

Hubrick died of diabetes in 1930. His works are considered very rare.  The only known museum to have a collection is the University of Alaska.

References

1858 births
1930 deaths
Artists from Alaska